Chut may refer to:

 Chut (Belarusian mythology), a home spirit in Belarusian mythology
 Chut!, a novel by Jean-Marie Gourio
 Chut language, spoken by Chut people in Viechutam
 Chut people, a Vietnamese ethnic group
 Chut thai, traditional Thai clothing
 Chut Wutty (1972–2012), a Cambodian environmental activist
 Chuts, a name applied to Jews who immigrated to London from the Netherlands during the latter part of the 19th century